Keft, in Iran, may refer to:
 Keft-e Nashalil
 Keft Gol Anbar
 Keft Kalkhanek